XHCRA-FM is a radio station on 93.1 FM in Álamo Temapache and Tuxpan, Veracruz. It is owned by Radiorama and carries its La Poderosa grupera format.

History
XHCRA received its concession on November 12, 1993. Originally put out for bid to be located in Cerro Azul, XHCRA was owned by Alejandro Solís Barrera. The current concessionaire was awarded the station in 2015.

The tower is on Cerro El Calvario in Álamo Temapache, but XHCRA is based in Tuxpan and is part of a Radiorama cluster that includes XHTVR-FM.

References

External links
La Poderosa 93.1

Radio stations in Veracruz